Nicolas Fritsch (born 19 December 1978 in Paris) is a French former professional road bicycle racer. He is a nephew of former professional cyclist Pierre Tosi.

Major results

2003
 1st, Tour du Finistère
 1st, Stage 3, Paris–Corrèze
2007
 1st, Overall Circuit de Saône-et-Loire
 1st, Stage 1, Ronde de l'Oise

External links

French male cyclists
1978 births
Living people
Cyclists from Paris